The SEAT Arosa (Typ 6H) is a city car that was manufactured by the Spanish automaker SEAT from 1997 to 2004. The model débuted in March 1997 at the Geneva Motor Show, while its facelifted version was presented in October 2000 at the Paris Motor Show. It shared a platform with the Volkswagen Lupo and was mostly identical apart from equipment, styling and trim levels.

The successor, SEAT Mii, started production in December 2011.

Pre facelift (1997–2000)
Named after Vilagarcía de Arousa, a municipality in the province of Pontevedra, Spain, it was only available as a three door, four-seater hatchback.

The Arosa, launched in 1997, was to a large extent identical to Volkswagen's own city car, which was introduced later in the end of 1998, Volkswagen Lupo, and both cars were based on the Volkswagen Group A00 platform, a shortened version of the A03 platform used by the larger Volkswagen Polo and SEAT Ibiza. 

The Czech motor vehicle manufacturer, Škoda, has also planned the own version of Arosa by 1998, but it was never officially introduced.

The Arosa was initially manufactured at a Volkswagen plant in Wolfsburg, Germany, and only in May 1998 was the production moved to SEAT facilities in Martorell, Spain. The Arosa was designed by the same man who designed the Bugatti Veyron 16.4, Jozef Kabaň. Production lasted from February 1997 to August 2000.

Facelift (2000–2004)
The model later received a facelift in October 2000. The Arosa replaced the SEAT Marbella in the Spanish brand's lineup, but itself was not replaced by any SEAT, when production ceased in July 2004. A successor eventually arrived in January 2012, with the Mii. Apart from its exterior restyling, the facelift model featured a restyled interior, with a new dashboard. 

Due to the decision taken by Volkswagen, to use the Fox instead of developing any genuine replacement for the Lupo, resulted in SEAT being unable to produce their own version. In the United Kingdom, 2,500 Arosas found homes in the country in 2003, accounting for around seven per cent of the firm’s sales. Production lasted from September 2000 to July 2004.

..

Engines
The Arosa was available with the following units:

Petrol engines
 1.0 L (999 cc) I4, 8v OHC, 37 kW (50 PS), 86 N·m (63.4 ft·lbf)
 1.4 L (1390 cc) I4, 8v OHC, 44 kW (60 PS), 116 N·m (85.6 ft·lbf)
 1.4 L (1390 cc) I4, 16v DOHC, 74 kW (101 PS), 128 N·m (94.4 ft·lbf)

Diesel engines
 1.4 L (1422 cc) TDI I3, 6v OHC, 55 kW (75 PS), 195 N·m (143.8 ft·lbf)
 1.7 L (1716 cc) SDI I4, 8v OHC, 44 kW (60 PS), 115 N·m (84.8 ft·lbf)

All engines came with a five speed manual transmission, with a four speed automatic optional on the 1.4 (44 kW).

Concept models

At the Frankfurt Motor Show in September 2001, SEAT presented two SEAT Arosa based concept cars:
 the  'SEAT Arosa Racer' 
 the  'SEAT Arosa City Cruiser'

Sales and production figures
Since its launch in 1997 up to 2004, more than 175,000 SEAT Arosa cars have been sold and produced.

The total production per year of SEAT Arosa cars, manufactured in SEAT and other Audi/Volkswagen group plants, is shown below :

Awards
Golden Steering Wheel 1997 
Utilitário do Ano Award 1998, in Portugal

References

External links

 Der Spiegel article on the SEAT Arosa 3L 
 SEAT Arosa image gallery

Arosa
City cars
Front-wheel-drive vehicles
2000s cars
Cars introduced in 1997